Marco Modolo (born 23 March 1989) is an Italian professional footballer who plays as a defender for and captains  club Venezia.

Career
Born in San Donà di Piave in the Province of Venice, Veneto, Modolo started his career at Lombard club Internazionale. In January 2007 he left for Pro Sesto along with Roberto De Filippis and Daniele Marino. On 31 August 2007 he joined Venezia from Venice. In 2008, he joined the Serie D club Sanvitese. In 2009, he returned to Venice for re-established Venezia in the 2009–10 Serie D. In 2010, he was signed by Pro Vercelli. The club won promotion in 2011 (to the third division) and again in 2012 (to the Serie B). In the 2012–13 Serie B, he wore no.6 shirt with 18 appearances. Modolo became a free agent on 1 July 2013. He was signed by Parma F.C. on 30 August but farmed to Slovenian club Gorica on the same day, along with Nabil Taïder and Abdelaye Diakité (Crotone/Parma). Parma had farmed more than 15 players to Gorica before the deal. The paperwork of his transfer was completed on 10 October. In January 2015 he returned to Italy by signing for the Carpi; summer of 2015 plays in Venezia.

References

External links
AIC profile (data by football.it) 
PrvaLiga profile 

1989 births
Living people
People from San Donà di Piave
Footballers from Veneto
Italian footballers
Association football defenders
Inter Milan players
S.S.D. Pro Sesto players
Venezia F.C. players
ND Gorica players
F.C. Pro Vercelli 1892 players
Parma Calcio 1913 players
Serie A players
Serie B players
Serie C players
Serie D players
Slovenian PrvaLiga players
Italian expatriate footballers
Expatriate footballers in Slovenia
Italian expatriate sportspeople in Slovenia
Sportspeople from the Metropolitan City of Venice